German Dmitriyevich Pyatnikov (born 23 January 1988) is a former Russian professional football player.

Career
Born in Leningrad, Pyatnikov began playing football in the FC Smena-Zenit youth academy. He would later join FC Zenit Saint Petersburg, but never broke into the first team. Pyatnikov played on loan for Smena-Zenit in the Russian Second Division before leaving the parent club Zenit.

Pyatnikov tried to resurrect his career by moving to Moldova, where he played for six months with FC Sfîntul Gheorghe. He would join FC Nistru Otaci on another short-term deal later in 2011.

References

External links
 
 

1988 births
Footballers from Saint Petersburg
Living people
Russian footballers
Association football forwards
Association football midfielders
FC Zenit Saint Petersburg players
FC Lokomotiv Moscow players
FC Sfîntul Gheorghe players
Russian expatriate footballers
Expatriate footballers in Moldova
Moldovan Super Liga players